Northampton Township may refer to:

Northampton Township, Summit County, Ohio
Northampton Township, Bucks County, Pennsylvania
Northampton Township, Somerset County, Pennsylvania

Township name disambiguation pages